Samuel Myers may refer to:

Samuel L. Myers Sr. (1919–2021), American economist, administrator, and civil rights advocate
Samuel Myers Jr. (born 1949), American economist
Sam Myers (1936–2006), American blues musician and songwriter
Sam Myers (rugby union)